The 2011 IFSC Climbing World Championships, the 11th edition, were held in Arco, Italy from 15 to 24 July 2011.

QiXin Zhong set a new world record of 6.26s in the final round against Stanislav Kokorin.

Medal winners overview

Lead

Women 
73 athletes attended the women's lead competition.

Men 
130 athletes attended the men's lead competition.

Bouldering

Women 
69 athletes attended the women's bouldering competition.

Men 
139 athletes attended the men's bouldering competition.

Speed

Women 
55 athletes competed in the women's speed climbing event.

Men 
73 athletes competed in the men's speed climbing event.

References 

IFSC Climbing World Championships
World Climbing Championships
International sports competitions hosted by Italy